Louis C. Wright was the third president of Baldwin-Wallace College in Berea, Ohio, serving from 1934 to 1948. Baldwin-Wallace College became Baldwin Wallace University in 2012.

Career 
Wright was president at BW from 1934 to 1948. During his presidency many of the Greek life organizations began to form on the campus.

References

External links 

 Encyclopedia of Baldwin Wallace History: Louis Clinton Wright

Year of birth missing
Year of death missing
Presidents of Baldwin Wallace University